Jacques Porter is a South African cricketer. He made his first-class debut on 17 October 2019, for Border in the 2019–20 CSA 3-Day Provincial Cup. He made his List A debut on 20 October 2019, for Border in the 2019–20 CSA Provincial One-Day Challenge.

References

External links
 

Year of birth missing (living people)
Living people
South African cricketers
Border cricketers
Place of birth missing (living people)